Brendan Woods (born June 11, 1992) is an American professional ice hockey forward. He is currently an unrestricted free agent who most recently played with the Providence Bruins in the American Hockey League (AHL). He is the son of former professional player and ECHL Hall of Famer Bob Woods.

Playing career
Woods was selected in the 5th round (129th overall) in the 2012 NHL Entry Draft by the Carolina Hurricanes after his freshman collegiate season with the University of Wisconsin in the Western Collegiate Hockey Association conference.

On April 10, 2013, Woods was signed to a three-year entry-level contract with the Hurricanes. He then began his professional career in the tail end of the 2012–13 with the Hurricanes AHL affiliate, the Charlotte Checkers.

In the 2014–15 season, his second full professional season, Woods was recalled by the Hurricanes and made his NHL debut, becoming the first player to appear in the NHL from junior USHL team the Muskegon Lumberjacks, in a 2-1 shootout victory against the New Jersey Devils on December 23, 2014.

As a free agent from the Hurricanes after 5 seasons within the organization, Woods went un-signed over the summer. On September 13, 2017, he accepted an invitation on a professional tryout contract to attend the training camp of the Ottawa Senators. He was later released by the Senators in the midst of the pre-season for the 2017–18 season. On October 11, 2017, he agreed to start the season with the Utica Comets of the AHL, signing a professional tryout contract with the affiliate of the Vancouver Canucks.

After two seasons with the Utica Comets, Woods left as a free agent to sign a two-year AHL contract with the Providence Bruins on July 8, 2019.

Career statistics

Awards and honors

References

External links

1992 births
Living people
American men's ice hockey left wingers
Carolina Hurricanes draft picks
Carolina Hurricanes players
Charlotte Checkers (2010–) players
Chicago Steel players
Ice hockey players from Pennsylvania
People from Lebanon County, Pennsylvania
Providence Bruins players
Utica Comets players
Wisconsin Badgers men's ice hockey players